El Faro is a Salvadoran online digital newspaper, founded in 1998. The newspaper claims to be the first exclusively digital newspaper in Latin America ("El primer periódico digital latinoamericano").

History 

Jorge Simán, of Palestinian origin and Carlos Dada, of Greek-Lebanese origin, are the founders of the newspaper. They are sons of political exiles, and they returned to El Salvador, with the purpose of starting a newspaper that would completely change Salvadoran media. Their return happened six years after the end of the Salvadoran civil war, marked by the Chapultepec Peace Accords of 1992. These agreements would guarantee greater political freedoms, and better possibilities to conduct independent journalism. Since its foundation, El Faro has been an effort to renovate the Salvadoran media, which has traditionally been dominated by conservative outlets as Telecorporación Salvadoreña, El Diario de Hoy and La Prensa Gráfica.

The online newspaper has grown steadily since its creation in April 1998.

Despite pressures to adapt to a commercial format, which are imposed by the Salvadoran media-industry, the editors have insisted on an alternative sort of journalism. This journalism is based on long in-depth pieces, investigative journalism and political analyses. Content is paramount to form, and this principle is explained by the flexibility of the digital format.

The newspaper gives room to most of the political ideologies present in El Salvador, although the editorials and commentaries show a left-leaning, non-partisan, anti-authoritarian ideology.

The online paper is published weekly, but new articles may be uploaded more frequently.

According to editor Carlos Dada, "for the first seven years, everybody involved in the production of El Faro worked on a voluntary basis". He explains that when the paper first started, it was mostly based on the work of journalism students. Many of these students came from the Universidad Centroamericana "José Simeón Cañas" and some of them were former students of Externado San José.

These students have gradually become recognized professional journalists and commentators. One example is Carlos Martínez D'aubuisson, who in 2011 won the Ortega y Gasset Award. This is one of the most important international recognitions for journalists who publish in Spanish. One of the digital newspaper's founders, Carlos Dada, won the Maria Moors Cabot Prize for outstanding reporting on Latin America and the Caribbean, in September 2011. This is the oldest award in international journalism. El Faro was described as "a vanguard, online news website which (Carlos Dada) runs from El Salvador, a small country that is still suffering from the trauma of its decade-long civil war. El Faro means lighthouse or beacon—and that's what it is. With a limited budget, it has consistently published outstanding stories and projects—investigating long-ignored crimes and human rights abuses and now tracking growing drug violence throughout Central America. From its inception in 1998, El Faro has shown how digital media can overcome barriers of cost and tradition and offer honest journalism of high quality in a region where press standards are low and much of the media is highly partisan or even corrupt."

The newspaper has also attracted contributions from diverse recognized personalities from the Salvadoran and Latin American, academic and political environments.

One of the most noteworthy pieces published by the newspaper is the exclusive interview with Captain Álvaro Saravia, one of the alleged assassins of Archbishop Óscar Romero. This article was published in March 2010, exactly 30 years after this assassination took place. The newspaper normally publishes in Spanish, but occasionally some articles are available in English and French, as is the case with this interview.

Controversies

Sexual abuse 
In July 2020, an accusation against Carlos Martínez for sexual harassment at a lake party came out to light, against a woman who worked as an editor for the same media outlet. Martínez is a journalist for El Faro. Among these events, El Faro admitted in an editorial note that, at a party on Lake Coatepeque, "there was improper behavior by a journalist from our newsroom against one of our colleagues."

Gang Alliance 
Several journalists from El Faro have been accused of having clandestine meetings with members and leaders of the main gangs that intimidate the Salvadoran population. In an interview, journalist from the newspaper El Faro, Juan Martínez d'Aubuisson, assured that the gangs in El Salvador fulfill a necessary "social role", despite being a terrorist group.

References

External links
 

Salvadoran news websites
Publications established in 1998
Spanish-language newspapers